Boronia duiganiae is a plant in the citrus family Rutaceae and is endemic to mountain ranges in south-east Queensland, Australia. It is an erect shrub with many branches, leaves with one, three or five leaflets, and pink to white, four-petalled flowers.

Description
The leaflets are elliptic to lance-shaped, with the narrower end towards the base and their undersides are densely hairy. The eight stamens are hairy.

Taxonomy and naming
Boronia duiganiae was first formally described in 1999 by Marco F. Duretto and the description was published in the journal Austrobaileya from a specimen collected near Rolleston. The specific epithet (duiganiae) honours the Australian palaeobotanist Suzanne Duigan.

Distribution and habitat
This boronia grows in woodland and forest on sandstone on the ranges south and south west of Rolleston and Springsure.

Conservation
Boronia duiganiae is classed as "least concern" under the Queensland Government Nature Conservation Act 1992.

References 

duiganiae
Flora of Queensland
Plants described in 1999
Taxa named by Marco Duretto